Australian Women's Health Women in Sport Awards were first awarded in 2011. The awards were established by the Australian Women's Health Magazine to recognise the achievements of Australian women in sport. The awards are the main awards for Australian women in sport and cover athletes, performances, teams, leaders and journalists. The awards are also known as "I Support Women in Sport Awards".

Hall of Fame

Women's Health Athlete

Outstanding Woman in Sport
Australian Federal Government Award.

Standout Moment

Champion Team

Person of Sporting Influence

Local Sporting Champion
Earlier awards called Local Heroine.

Leadership Legend

One to Watch

Young Achiever

Irregular or Ceased Awards
Service to Sport: 2011 - Layne Beachley (Surfing) ; 2013 - Stephanie Gilmore (Surfing) ; 2014 - Catherine Cox (Netball) ;  2015 - Lydia Lassila (Aerial skiing)
Grassroots Greatest: 2011 - Cathy Lambert (Paralympic sport)
Unsung Hero: 2011 - Julie Coutts
Comeback of the Year: 2011 - Anna Meares (Cycling) ; 2018 - Cate Campbell (Swimming) ; 2019 - Lauren Parker (Para Triathlon)
Fair Fighter: 2011 - Sam Stosur (Tennis) ; 2012 - Bridie Kean (Wheelchair Basketball) ; 2013 - Sally Pearson (Athletics) ; 2014 - Jordan Mercer (Surf Life Saving) ; 2015 - Caroline Buchanan (BMX) ; 2016 - Liesl Tesch (Paralympic Sailing, Wheelchair Basketball) and Ruan Sims (Rugby League, Rugby Union)
Person of Sporting Words: 2011 - Joanna Griggs (Seven Network) ; 2012 - Giaan Rooney (Nine Network) ; 2013 - Liz Ellis (Fox Sports and SBS) ; 2014 - Mel McLaughlin (Fox Sports and Network 10) ; 2015 - Amanda Shalala (ABC)
Contribution to Community: 2015 - Amna Karra-Hassan (AFL)

References

Australian sports trophies and awards
History of sport in Australia
Awards established in 2011
Austra
Women's sport in Australia
Sports awards honoring women